The 2018 Speed Energy Stadium Super Trucks Series was the sixth season of the Stadium Super Trucks series. The season consisted of 20 races; it began on January 27, 2018 at Lake Elsinore Diamond and concluded on January 20, 2019 at Foro Sol in conjunction with the 2019 Race of Champions.

With a series-high six wins and 540 total points, Matthew Brabham won his first championship. Gavin Harlien finished second in the standings with 490 points and five wins.

Drivers

Schedule

Season summary
The season began at the Lake Elsinore Diamond, where the 2017 finale had been held. Apdaly Lopez won the Feature event, but confusion arose in the days following the race as multiple drivers took the Joker Lap on the final lap, which is not allowed per series rules. After video review by series officials, Bill Hynes – who ran the Joker on the penultimate lap – was declared the winner, though Lopez was allowed to keep his win. Matthew Brabham, who finished seventh, was also revealed to have utilized the same strategy as Hynes, and had his finishing position upgraded to second alongside Jeff Hoffman.

A tripleheader at Australia's Adelaide Street Circuit followed. In the first race, rookie Cole Potts took advantage of Robby Gordon's transmission problem and Brabham locking his brakes entering a turn to win his first SST race. Gordon rebounded to win the second, while Brabham won the final round; Gordon had been in position to win the third race when he entered the final corner too deep, allowing Brabham to capitalize and win. Behind him, Gavin Harlien's truck landed off a jump at a poor angle, resulting in a broken right rear wheel that caused him to hit the wall. Harlien continued to accelerate until he crossed the start/finish line to finish sixth.

At the Grand Prix of Long Beach, the first race was stopped after Apdaly Lopez rolled his truck with 17 minutes left; race officials chose not to resume the event and leader Harlien was declared the winner, scoring his maiden series victory. Series commentator Sean Sermini criticized the decision during the broadcast, calling it "Very upsetting." Brabham won the second round of the weekend.

In May, the series returned to Australia to race at Barbagallo Raceway in Perth. Matt Nolan, running his first points race, flipped while jumping on a ramp in the first event, causing his truck's left rear wheel to come off; the wheel eventually hit a vacant spectator bridge. The incident eventually spurred the Confederation of Australian Motor Sport (CAMS) to suspend the series from CAMS-sanctioned races for safety concerns, though SST officials were not notified of the news until July. The weekend concluded with Arie Luyendyk Jr. and Jeff Hoffman scoring their first series wins, while Brabham recorded the overall weekend win.

Harlien and Luyendyk won at Detroit, the former holding off Aaron Bambach and Luyendyk for the win in the first race. Six laps into the second round, Luyendyk was the race leader when the red flag came out for Paul Morris' wreck in turn three that sent him airborne and onto his truck's roof after hitting a tire barrier.

The series returned to Texas Motor Speedway for a second year in June. Japanese rally driver E. J. Chiba made his series debut, while Gordon returned for the weekend after missing the Detroit weekend to race in the Baja 500. On lap 16 of 18, Harlien passed Morris for the lead and eventually won Race One, while Brabham took advantage of the field fighting among themselves for position to win Race Two.

In August, the trucks made their debut at Road America in support of the NASCAR Xfinity Series' Johnsonville 180, running a shortened course that bypassed turns 6–12, though the full circuit was utilized for the final laps. NASCAR drivers Casey Mears and Greg Biffle competed in the weekend, the latter making his SST debut. Gordon and Brabham won the weekend's races, while Biffle finished second in the latter.

Nolan's wreck at Perth and the CAMS suspension forced the series' planned competition in October's Gold Coast 600 at Surfers Paradise to be called off. During the month, the series, represented by Queen's Counsel barrister Stewart Anderson, went to court against CAMS in a case overseen by the Supreme Court of Victoria. Anderson argued new wheels would be built with forged billet aluminium that makes them heavier and less likely to detach than the current cast alloy; in an inspection conducted by retired V8 Supercar driver Larry Perkins, he gave his approval of the trucks and pointed out their safety was comparable to the Supercars. Anderson also claimed CAMS and SST had formed an agreement in February in which the former agreed the series was being operated within CAMS' satisfaction, while the delay until July to inform SST officials was a breach of contract. On October 11, judge John Digby ruled in favor of CAMS. The ban would not be lifted until August 2019.

Six days after the trial, SST partnered with the Australian Auto Sport Alliance, which is not affiliated with CAMS, and the Australian Motor Racing Series (AMRS), ensuring the series' future in the country. After a risk assessment, the AASA and NSW Sport and Recreation approved the series for competition in AMRS event. The trucks' first race weekend under the AMRS banner took place nine days later at the Sydney Motorsport Park, won by Brabham and Harlien. 2005 V8 Supercar Championship Series champion Russell Ingall contested his first SST weekend.

To close out the 2018 calendar year, the series participated in the Robby Gordon Off-Road World Championships at Glen Helen Raceway. Hoffman and Harlien were victorious in the two rounds, while Brabham finished second in both races, placing him in position to win the championship.

The 2019 Race of Champions at Autódromo Hermanos Rodríguez's Foro Sol in Mexico City served as the season finale. Due to the Race of Champions' track and race format, the trucks utilized a head-to-head bracket system in which two drivers competed against each other, with the winner advancing to the next round; should a driver lose in the first two rounds, they may proceed if they were the fastest of the defeated drivers as the "Fastest Loser". After three rounds, the final two drivers competed in the final round. Gordon won Saturday's racing after defeating Brabham, while Brabham clinched the championship when he won against Harlien in the third round on Sunday; Brabham ended the 2018 season by beating Hoffman in the final.

Results and standings

Race results

Race of Champions

Drivers' championship

Driver replacements

Notes

References

2018 in American motorsport
2018 in Australian motorsport